The Young Wife is a 2023 American drama film, written, directed, and produced by Tayarisha Poe. It stars Kiersey Clemons, Leon Bridges, Kelly Marie Tran, Michaela Watkins, Aya Cash, Sandy Honig, Brandon Michael Hall, Lukita Maxwell, Sheryl Lee Ralph and Judith Light.

It had its world premiere at South by Southwest on March 12, 2023.

Cast
 Kiersey Clemons
 Leon Bridges
 Kelly Marie Tran
 Michaela Watkins
 Aya Cash
 Sandy Honig
 Brandon Micheal Hall
 Lukita Maxwell
 Sheryl Lee Ralph
 Judith Light
 Connor Paolo
 Aida Osman
 Jon Rudnitsky

Production
In March 2022, Kiersey Clemons, Leon Bridges, Kelly Marie Tran, Michaela Watkins, Aya Cash, Sandy Honig, Brandon Michael Hall, Lukita Maxwell, Sheryl Lee Ralph Judith Light, Aida Osman, Connor Paolo, and Jon Rudnitsky joined the cast of the film, with Tayarisha Poe directing from a screenplay she wrote.

Release
It had its world premiere at South by Southwest on March 12, 2023.

References

External links
 

American drama films
FilmNation Entertainment films